{{DISPLAYTITLE:33 1/3 (disambiguation)}}
 is a series of books written about important and/or seminal music albums.

 may also refer to:

 Naked Gun : The Final Insult, a 1994 comedy film and the third film in The Naked Gun series
 Thirty Three & 1/3, an album by George Harrison
  (album), an album by John Farnham
 33 and a Third, an album by Def Dee

See also
 33 1/3 RPM (disambiguation), the playing speed, in rotations per minute, of some records